Nolan West (born September 30, 1990) is an American politician serving in the Minnesota House of Representatives since 2017. A member of the Republican Party of Minnesota, West represents District 37B in the northern Twin Cities metropolitan area, which includes the city of Blaine and parts of Anoka County.

Early life, education, and career 
West was raised in Blaine, Minnesota. He attended Meadow Creek Christian School in Andover (the year after he graduated, the school’s name was changed to Legacy Christian Academy). He attended the University of Minnesota and graduated with a Bachelor of Arts in history with a minor in political science. He was a legislative assistant for the Republican caucus in the Minnesota House of Representatives for almost two years until he resigned in September 2016 following reports of several racist posts he had made on Facebook.

Minnesota House of Representatives 
West was elected to the Minnesota House of Representatives in 2016, after incumbent Tim Sanders retired, and has been reelected every two years since. He serves as an assistant minority leader and sits on the Capital Investment, Education Finance, and Transportation Finance and Policy Committees.

West's first session was the 90th legislative session (2017-18), in which he was chief author of 30 bills, most notably HF0187, HF0297, and HF1496, all of which addressed one of the main infrastructure issues of his district, Highway 65. No bill that West chief authored made it through committee; all were dead/failed.

HF0187, which addressed the reconstruction of 105th Ave., was introduced to the Transportation Finance Committee but no further actions were taken. SF172, the Senate companion bill, was authored by Senator Jerry Newton, who pushed it into the 90th "First Special Session, HF5, Art. 1, Sec. 15, Sub. 3".

HF5 was authored by Representative Dean Urdahl and addressed the 105th Ave. reconstruction by granting $3,246,000 to the city of Blaine to predesign, design, and reconstruct 105th Avenue in the vicinity of the National Sports Center in Blaine.

West's second session was the 91st legislative session (2019-20), in which he was chief author of nine bills, most notably HF1597 and HF3285, both of which address Highway 65 and the intersection of 109th Ave. No bill that West chief authored during the 91st session made it through committee except HF3285, which was pushed into the 91st Legislature, 2020 5th Special Session by the Transportation Finance Committee.

HF3285 was addressed in HF0001 during the 91st Legislature, 2020 5th Special Session, authored by Representative Mary Murphy, and addressed the issue of the intersection of 109th Ave by allocating $1.5 million to "Anoka County to complete preliminary engineering, environmental analysis, and final design of a grade separation and associated improvements to Anoka County State-Aid Highway 12, known as 109th Avenue, at marked Trunk Highway 65 in the city of Blaine".

Electoral history

Personal life 
West resides in Blaine, Minnesota.

References

External links 

 Official House of Representatives website
 Official campaign website

1990 births
Living people
Republican Party members of the Minnesota House of Representatives
21st-century American politicians